Jeremy Price Walker (born June 12, 1995) is an American professional baseball pitcher in the Philadelphia Phillies organization. Walker was drafted by the Atlanta Braves in the 5th round of the 2016 MLB draft. He has played in Major League Baseball (MLB) for the Braves, with whom he made his MLB debut in 2019.

Career

Atlanta Braves
Walker attended Calvary Baptist Day School (2010-12) Winston-Salem, North Carolina and Davie County High School (2013) Mocksville, North Carolina.  He attended Gardner–Webb University and played college baseball for the Runnin' Bulldogs for three years. Walker was drafted by the Atlanta Braves in the 5th round, with the  139th overall selection, of the 2016 MLB draft. 

In 2016, Walker played for the Danville Braves, going 3–3 with a 3.18 ERA in  innings. He spent the 2017 season with the Rome Braves, going 7–11 with a 3.97 ERA in 138 innings. He split the 2018 season between the Florida Fire Frogs and the Gwinnett Stripers, combining to go 6–11 with a 3.84 ERA in 143 innings. He opened the 2019 season with the Mississippi Braves and was named to the Southern League All-Star team. He was promoted to Gwinnett on July 5.

On July 24, 2019, the Braves selected Walker's contract and promoted him to the major leagues. He made his MLB debut two days later on July 26 against the Philadelphia Phillies, allowing one hit in one scoreless inning. On February 12, 2021, Walker was released following the waiver claim of Travis Demeritte.

San Francisco Giants
On February 24, 2021, Walker signed a minor league contract with the San Francisco Giants organization.

Tampa Bay Rays
On August 1, 2022, the Giants traded Walker to the Tampa Bay Rays in exchange for Ford Proctor. He elected free agency on November 10, 2022.

Philadelphia Phillies
On December 8, 2022, Walker announced on Instagram that he had signed a contract with the Philadelphia Phillies. The minor-league contract included an invite to spring training. On January 24, 2023, he was assigned to the Lehigh Valley IronPigs, the organization's AAA affiliate.

References

External links

Gardner–Webb Runnin' Bulldogs bio

1995 births
Living people
People from Davie County, North Carolina
Baseball players from North Carolina
Major League Baseball pitchers
Atlanta Braves players
Gardner–Webb Runnin' Bulldogs baseball players
Danville Braves players
Rome Braves players
Florida Fire Frogs players
Mississippi Braves players
Gwinnett Stripers players
Peoria Javelinas players